HMS Assistance was a 50-gun fourth rate ship of the line of the Royal Navy, built at a private yard on the River Medway to the draught specified by the 1745 Establishment, and launched on 22 December 1747.

Assistance served until 1773, when she was sold out of the navy.

Notes

References

Lavery, Brian (2003) The Ship of the Line - Volume 1: The development of the battlefleet 1650-1850. Conway Maritime Press. .

Ships of the line of the Royal Navy
1747 ships